Ronald Victor Blair (born 26 September 1949) is a Northern Irish former professional football player and manager.

Career
Born in Coleraine, Blair played for Coleraine, Oldham Athletic, Preston North End, Rochdale, Colorado Caribous and Blackpool. He also earned one cap for the Northern Ireland national team.

He later became player-manager at Castleton Gabriels, and manager at Bacup Borough.

References

1949 births
Living people
Association footballers from Northern Ireland
Northern Ireland international footballers
Coleraine F.C. players
Oldham Athletic A.F.C. players
Preston North End F.C. players
Rochdale A.F.C. players
Colorado Caribous players
Blackpool F.C. players
Rochdale Town F.C. players
English Football League players
North American Soccer League (1968–1984) players
Association football midfielders
Football managers from Northern Ireland
Expatriate association footballers from Northern Ireland
Expatriate footballers in England
Expatriate soccer players in the United States
Expatriate sportspeople from Northern Ireland in the United States
Expatriate football managers from Northern Ireland
Expatriate football managers in England